Cristiano Fagundes Dias (born May 25, 1986), sometimes known as just Cristiano, is a Brazilian footballer who most recently played for Puerto Rico FC in the North American Soccer League.

Career

Brazil 

Cristiano Dias began his playing career in his native Brazil, and has played for several lower-division Brazilian clubs, including São Carlos, São Bento, Osasco, and Desportivo Brasil

United States 

Cristiano Dias signed with Miami FC prior to its inaugural season in the USL First Division in 2007, having previously played for the team's original head coach Chiquinho de Assis, and became a mainstay of the team's defensive line. He played for Miami during four seasons.

On March 22, 2011, Cristiano Dias signed with NSC Minnesota Stars of the North American Soccer League. and also won the NASL championship in the same year being one of the most important player in the Minnesota defensive line.

After nearly 100 appearances with Minnesota United, Cristiano Dias signed with NASL expansion side Puerto Rico FC on March 30, 2016.

Honours 

2011 North American Soccer League season Champion with Minnesota United FC

2012 North American Soccer League season Runner Up with Minnesota United FC

2014 North American Soccer League season Spring Season Champion with Minnesota United FC

2016 Copa Luis Villarejo Champion with Puerto Rico FC

References 

4. https://www.besoccer.com/player/cristiano-225121

5. https://www.oursportscentral.com/services/releases/minnesota-stars-fc-re-sign-defender-cristiano-dias/n-4551752

6. http://mnu.ezitsolutions.net/awards-and-accolades

7. https://www.epluribusloonum.com/2019/12/16/20995889/2012-minnesota-stars-fc-starting-xi

8. https://www.nytimes.com/2017/04/11/sports/soccer/carmelo-anthony-puerto-rico-fc.html?_r=2&referer=http://m.facebook.com

1986 births
Living people
Brazilian footballers
São Carlos Futebol Clube players
Esporte Clube São Bento players
Miami FC (2006) players
Minnesota United FC (2010–2016) players
USSF Division 2 Professional League players
North American Soccer League players
Desportivo Brasil players
Expatriate soccer players in the United States
Missouri Comets players
Major Indoor Soccer League (2008–2014) players
Puerto Rico FC players
Association football defenders
Brazilian expatriate footballers
Brazilian expatriate sportspeople in the United States
Expatriate footballers in Puerto Rico
Brazilian expatriate sportspeople in Puerto Rico